Deborah Perry Piscione is a Silicon Valley-based entrepreneur, national bestselling author, media commentator and public speaker. She is a Principal at Vorto Consulting and specializes in innovation process and talent development.  Perry Piscione is the architect of the new innovation methodology, Improvisational Innovation, which engages all of the organization's talent in bottoms up innovation. She is the co-founder and CEO of Desha Productions, Inc., a multimedia company that owns and operates Alley to the Valley™ and BettyConfidential, and co-founder of Chump Genius, an educational gaming company for kids.

Career

Perry Piscione began her career on January 3, 1989 with the 101st United States Congress.   During her time in Washington, D.C., she served as a congressional staffer for U.S. Senator Connie Mack and U.S. Representative Ileana Ros-Lehtinen, and as a political appointee for President George H. W. Bush.

In 1998, Perry Piscione first appeared on MSNBC, and then subsequently appeared on Fox News and CNN, among other major networks. She continued to work as a television and radio commentator for the remainder of her time in Washington, D.C.

In 2006, Perry Piscione moved to the Silicon Valley and built out three companies in six years.  In 2007, she cofounded Desha Productions, Inc.  with Shaun Marsh, a computer scientist, and launched BettyConfidential, an online magazine for the coveted women's market. By 2010, the site had received recognition as one of Forbes''' Top 100 Websites for Women, as one of AlwayOn's OnHollywood 100 Top Private Companies  and as winner of Editorial Excellence at min's Best of the Web Awards.

In 2010, she created Alley to the Valley (initially with 85 Broads founder, Janet Hansen). Alley to the Valley™ networks the world's most influential women for dealmaking.

In 2012, she co-founded Chump Genius with 3D illustrators, Mark and Lee Fullerton. Chump Genius™ is a gaming app series that combines entertainment fantasy adventures with 21st century science and math education for boys ages 8+.

Published booksThe People Equation: Why Innovation Is People, Not Products (2017, with Dr. David Crawley)The Risk Factor: Why Every Organization Needs Big Bets, Bold Characters, and the Occasional Spectacular Failure (2014)Secrets of Silicon Valley: What Everyone Else Can Learn from the Innovation Capital of the World (2013)Unfinished Business: A Democrat and a Republican Take on the 10 Most Important Issues Women Face'' (2002, with Dr. Julianne Malveaux)

References

Sources
"Company Overview of Desha Productions, Inc." Bloomberg Businessweek. Retrieved November 27, 2012. <http://investing.businessweek.com/research/stocks/private/snapshot.asp?privcapid=60984108>.
"Deborah Perry Piscione." All American Speakers. All American Speakers LLC. Retrieved November 27, 2012. <http://www.allamericanspeakers.com/speakers/Deborah-Perry-Piscione/6285>.
"Introducing Alley to the Valley: Women Entrepreneurs and Investors Bring Dealmaking to the Fore." Global Leadership Post. September 24, 2012. Retrieved December 5, 2012. <https://web.archive.org/web/20121107175622/http://www.globalleaderpost.com/7/post/2012/09/introducing-alley-to-the-valley-women-entrepreneurs-and-investors-bring-dealmaking-to-the-fore-new-york-october-24th-2012.html>.
"Deborah Perry Piscione." Keynote Speakers, Inc. Retrieved November 28, 2012. <http://keynotespeakers.com/speaker_detail.php?speakerid=4823>.
"Deborah Perry Piscione." Stanford Graduate School of Business, September 19, 2011. Retrieved December 3, 2012. <https://web.archive.org/web/20121224160942/http://www.alleytothevalley.com/wp/wp-content/uploads/2011/10/stanford-case-study-deborah-perry-piscione.pdf>.
"Co-authors of Unfinished Business: A Democrat and a Republican Take on the 10 Most Important Issues Women Face to Give 12th Annual Luann Dummer Lecture." St. Thomas Newsroom. University of St. Thomas. February 28, 2005. Retrieved December 4, 2012. <http://www.stthomas.edu/news/2005/02/28/co-authors-of-unfinished-business-a-democrat-and-a-republican-take-on-the-10-most-important-issues-women-face-to-give-12th-annual-luann-dummer-lecture/>.
Casserly, Meghan, and Jenna Goudreau. "Top 100 Websites for Women." Forbes.com. Forbes Magazine. June 23, 2010. Retrieved December 3, 2012. <https://www.forbes.com/2010/06/23/100-best-womens-blogs-forbes-woman-time-websites.html>.
 Perkins, Tony. "Announcing the 2010 OnHollywood 100 Top Private Companies." AlwaysOn. AlwaysOn Network. September 29, 2010. Retrieved December 3, 2012. <http://alwayson.goingon.com/node/66193>.
Ryckman, Pamela. "The Risk-Taking Edge Of West Coast Women." NYTimes.com. The New York Times, 11 Nov. 2010. Web. 03 Dec. 2012. <https://www.nytimes.com/2010/11/11/business/smallbusiness/11sbiz.html?_r=1>.
"Introducing Alley to the Valley: Women Entrepreneurs and Investors Bring Dealmaking to the Fore." Global Leadership Post. September 24, 2012. Retrieved December 5, 2012. <https://web.archive.org/web/20121107175622/http://www.globalleaderpost.com/7/post/2012/09/introducing-alley-to-the-valley-women-entrepreneurs-and-investors-bring-dealmaking-to-the-fore-new-york-october-24th-2012.html>.
"Extreme Parenting Controversy." CNN.com. Cable News Network. November 23, 2011. Retrieved December 3, 2012. <http://transcripts.cnn.com/TRANSCRIPTS/1111/23/ddhln.01.html>.
"Deborah Perry Piscione, Speaker on Women in Leadership, Motivational." Executive Speakers Bureau Speaker. Retrieved December 2, 2012. <http://www.executivespeakers.com/speaker/Deborah_Perry_Piscione>.

Living people
American non-fiction writers
American business executives
Year of birth missing (living people)